Antrodiella indica is a species of fungus in the family Steccherinaceae. Found in Chandigarh, India, it was described as new to science in 2015. It is similar to Antrodiella romellii, from which it can be distinguished by its smaller spores, which measure 3.5 by 2.5 µm.

References

External links

Fungi described in 2015
Fungi of India
Steccherinaceae